Walcott Lake is one of several lakes in the Alph River system on the Scott Coast of Antarctica. Walcott South Stream flows from the glacier into the lake. The lake was named by the New Zealand Geographic Board (NZGB) (1994) in association with Walcott Glacier.

Two ice streams flow into the lake from the glacier. They are named Walcott North Stream and Walcott South Stream in association with the glacier, and descriptively for their locations on it.

References 

Lakes of Victoria Land
Scott Coast